Virgil Creek is a river located in Tompkins County, New York. It flows into Fall Creek by Freeville, New York.

References

Rivers of Tompkins County, New York
Rivers of New York (state)
Rivers of Cortland County, New York